Carlos Santos de Jesus (born 25 February 1985 in São Paulo, Brazil) is a Brazilian professional footballer. He gained Croatian nationality in October 2007.

Club career

São Paulo
Carlos came through the youth ranks of São Paulo and signed a senior contract in 2004, but was unable to record a single cap in the senior squad.

Dinamo Zagreb
On 30 January 2006 Carlos joined Croatian side Dinamo Zagreb. The club paid his transfer €40,000. At first, he was playing on a centre–back position, but in recent seasons he had much more impact as a left full-back. Carlos also spent six months on loan in Varteks during the 2008–09 season, after he found himself out of manager Marijan Vlak's plans. Following his return, he often started in the first–eleven, but found himself on the bench again when the club signed Leandro Cufré. On February 5, 2010, it was announced on the official site of Shandong Luneng that they signed him. In January 2011, he was loaned to NK Zagreb. He played in five games, scoring a goal in the last-round match against Hrvatski Dragovoljac. In July 2011, his contract with Dinamo Zagreb was terminated by mutual consent.

Ettifaq
He was subsequently signed by the Saudi club Ettifaq FC from Dammam. After two seasons with Ettifaq Carlos left the club.

Zob Ahan
In 2013 Carlos signed with Iran Pro League side Zob Ahan. In his first year with the club, he made 15 league appearances and helped Zob Ahan avoid relegation. On 1 June 2014, Santos renewed his contract with Zob Ahan, signed a two-year contract until 2016.

Honours
 Dinamo Zagreb
 Prva HNL: 2005–06, 2006–07, 2007–08, 2008–09
 Croatian Cup: 2006–07, 2007–8, 2008–09
 Zob Ahan
 Hazfi Cup: 2014–15

Career statistics

References

External links
Profile at Nogometni Magazin
Profile at Dinamo Zagreb's official website 

Living people
1985 births
Brazilian footballers
Brazilian expatriate footballers
Croatian Football League players
Brazilian expatriate sportspeople in China
GNK Dinamo Zagreb players
NK Varaždin players
NK Zagreb players
Shandong Taishan F.C. players
Chinese Super League players
Expatriate footballers in Croatia
Expatriate footballers in China
Footballers from São Paulo (state)
Ettifaq FC players
Expatriate footballers in Saudi Arabia
Expatriate footballers in Iran
Ratchaburi Mitr Phol F.C. players
Al-Shorta SC players
Thai League 1 players
Brazilian expatriate sportspeople in Thailand
Expatriate footballers in Thailand
Brazilian expatriate sportspeople in Croatia
Brazilian expatriate sportspeople in Iran
Brazilian expatriate sportspeople in Saudi Arabia
Association football defenders
Saudi Professional League players